Mohamed El Mazem is an Emirati singer.

Early life
His actual release was in the year 1989, when he presented an album, "Habib who is not my heart adored" and now he owns 15 albums, most of which are romantic songs.

Discography

Albums
 Sweetheart of others 1989
 Muhammad Al-Mazem 1990
 Muhammad Al-Mazem 1993
 Atheeb Lama 1994
 Tanch 1995
 Fadec 1995
 Like Candles 1996
 Almazam 1998
 The look of the mazem 2000
 Ayoun Al-Mazem 2001
 I love you 2002
 Al-Mazam Candle 2003
 Malik Albi 2007

National songs
 Emirates of Arabism and generosity
 Operetta uniting the armed forces in Abu Dhabi
 Country of pride with the house band
 Operetta Loyalty and Belonging
 Fadetk our dear mother

See also
 Hussain Al Jassmi
 Esther Eden
 Mehad Hamad

References

Living people
People from the Emirate of Sharjah
Emirati male singers
Emirati composers
1985 births